Battle of Jiangnan may refer to:

 Battle of Jiangnan (1856)
 Battle of Jiangnan (1860)